Jeonju University (JJ) is a private Christian university in South Korea. The campus is located in 1200 Hyoja-dong, Wansan-gu, Jeonju, Jeollabuk-do.

History 

Jeonju University was founded on January 9, 1964, as Jeonju Youngsaeng College (an evening college). In December 1977 the school foundation established a daytime college, and on October 7, 1978, the college was renamed Jeonju College. In February 1981 it moved to present-day Hyoja-dong Campus. It acquired a university status on September 8, 1983, and renamed Jeonju University. In December 1984 Shindonga Group succeeded the school foundation.

Undergraduate Schools 
 College of Humanities
 College of Social Sciences
 College of Economics and Business Administration
 College of Alternative Medicine
 Departments: Physical Therapy and Radiological Science
 College of Engineering
 College of Arts and Athletics
 College of Culture and Tourism
 College of Education
 College of Culture and Creative Industry
 School of Liberal Arts

Graduate Schools 
 General Graduate School
 Special Graduate Schools
 Graduate School of Public Administration
 Graduate School of International Studies and Management
 Graduate School of Education
 Graduate School of Information and Industrial Engineering
 Graduate School of Mission and Theology
 Graduate School of Counseling
 Graduate School of Alternative Medicine

Notable people 
Kim Woo-bin, actor and model

References

External links 
Official Website (English)

Universities and colleges in North Jeolla Province
Jeonju